Cycling is a common mode of transport in the Netherlands, with 36% of Dutch people listing the bicycle as their most frequent way of getting around on a typical day, as opposed to the car (45%) and public transport (11%). Cycling has a modal share of 27% of all trips (urban and rural) nationwide. In cities this is even higher, such as Amsterdam which has 38%, and Zwolle 46%. This high frequency of bicycle travel is enabled by excellent cycling infrastructure such as cycle paths, cycle tracks, protected intersections, ample bicycle parking and by making cycling routes shorter and more direct (and therefore usually quicker) than car routes.

In the countryside, a growing number of routes connect the Netherlands' villages, towns and cities: some of these paths are part of the Dutch National Cycle Network, a network of routes for bicycle tourism which reaches all corners of the nation.

History

Cycling became popular in the Netherlands a little later than it did in the United States and Britain, which experienced their bike booms in the 1880s, but by the 1890s the Dutch were already building dedicated paths for cyclists. By 1911, the Dutch owned more bicycles per capita than any other country in Europe.

The ownership and use of bicycles continued to increase and in 1940 there were around four million bicycles in a population of eight million. Half of these bicycles disappeared during the German occupation, but after the war the use of bicycles quickly returned to normal and continued at a high level until 1960 (annual distance covered by bicycle for each inhabitant: 1500 km). Then, much like it had in other developed nations, the privately owned motor car became more affordable and therefore more commonly in use and bicycles as a result less popular. That is: ownership still remained high, but use fell to around 800 km annually. Even so, the number of Dutch people cycling was very high compared to other European nations.
 
The trend away from the bicycle and towards motorised transport only began to decrease in the 1970s when Dutch people took to the streets to protest against the high number of child deaths on the roads: in some years over 500 children were killed in collisions with motor vehicles. This protest movement, initiated by Maartje van Putten (later an MEP), was known as the Stop de Kindermoord ("Stop the Child Murder").
 The success of this movement  — along with other factors, such as the oil shortages of 1973–74 and the publication of the CROW Design Manual for Bicycle Traffic — turned government policy around.  The country began to restrict urban motor vehicle use and direct its focus on growth towards other forms of transport, with the bicycle perceived as critical in making streets safer and towns and cities more people-friendly and livable.

Overview

Besides the history and social movements, there is no single reason as to why cycling remains so popular in the Netherlands: many bicycle friendly factors reinforce each other:

Geography, built environment and weather
 The Netherlands is a relatively densely populated and very flat country, which means that journey distances tend to be short, even between towns. (It can be very windy though.)
 The cool climate of the Netherlands means that one can cycle very short distances without breaking into a sweat. This means that people can cycle to work or school without having to shower or wash straight afterwards, as they more often might have to do in warm, hot or humid climates.
Bike-friendly infrastructure
 There is a continuous network of cycle paths, clearly signposted, well maintained and well lit, with road/cycle path junctions that often give priority to cyclists. This makes cycling itself convenient, pleasant, and safe.
 There is also a good network of bicycle shops throughout the country.
Bike-friendly public policy, planning and laws
 The needs of cyclists are taken into account in all stages of urban planning. Urban areas are frequently organised as woonerven (living streets), which prioritise cyclists and pedestrians over motorised traffic.
 The Netherlands employs a standards-based approach to road design, where conflicts between different modes of transport are eliminated wherever possible and reduced in severity as much as possible where elimination is not possible. The result of this is that cycling is made both objectively and subjectively safe. Towns have been designed with limited access by cars and limited (decreasing over time) car parking. The resulting heavy traffic and very limited car parking makes car use unattractive in towns.
 A form of strict liability has been law in the Netherlands since the early 1990s for bicycle-motor vehicle accidents. In a nutshell this means that, in a collision between a car and a cyclist, the driver's insurer is deemed to be liable to pay damages (n.b. motor vehicle insurance is mandatory in the Netherlands, while cyclist insurance is not) to the cyclist's property and their medical bills as long as 1) the cyclist did not intentionally crash into the motor vehicle, and 2) the cyclist was not in error in some way. If the cyclist was in error, as long as the collision was still unintentional, the motorist's insurance must still pay half of the damages — though this doesn't apply if the cyclist is under 14 years of age, in which case the motorist must pay full damages. If it can be proved that a cyclist intended to collide with the car, then the cyclist must pay the damages (or his/her parents in the case of a minor.)
 No compulsory bicycle helmet laws. In the Netherlands, bicycle helmets are not commonly worn; they are mostly used by young children and the extremely few road cyclists and mountain bikers there who ride road bikes or mountain bikes. In fact, the Dutch Fietsersbond (Cyclists' Union) summarized existing evidence and concluded that, for normal, slow, everyday cycling (i.e. not road cycling), a compulsory helmet law would have a negative impact on population health.
Cycling and environmental sustainability
 Through higher use of bikes and lower usage of cars and public transportation, the Dutch lower their ecological footprint and help the environment.
 Bike usage significantly lowers fossil fuel consumption and energy per capita use, leading to less pollution and other environmental damage.
Cycling culture
 Cycling is a symbol of Dutch culture. It has been considered a national symbol since 1920 and a very patriotic means of transportation since 1938.
 Bicycling is presented in Dutch qualities and civil virtues of independence, self-control, modesty and stability.
 Cycling has had a positive effect on tourism, people visit the Netherlands to experience its specific cycling culture.
 Road cycling and mountain biking is also near-universally frowned upon and disparaged. In fact, the Dutch have a widely accepted derogatory pejorative for road cyclists called "wielrenner"(wheel runner in Dutch).
Health effects and the economics of cycling
 Cycling prevents about 6500 deaths each year, and Dutch people have half-a-year-longer life expectancy because of cycling.
 The health benefits correspond to more than 3% of the Dutch gross domestic product.
 It is confirmed that investments made in bicycle-promoting policies (e.g., improved bicycle infrastructure and facilities) will likely yield a high cost–benefit ratio in the long term.
Very slow bicycles and equipment
 The long-standing bike culture has meant that most bicycles are slow, heavy utility bicycles rather than road and mountain bikes (though all types of bikes are to be seen, from road bikes, to recumbents, right through to velomobiles, though there are extremely rare—ridden by less than 1% of the Dutch population). The Dutch mainly choose to ride roadster bicycles, like the ubiquitous and infamous Omafiets, which are practical (for the Netherlands, due to its almost complete lack of hills and urban sprawl), low-maintenance and suited to load carrying, with mudguards and skirt-guards, and where the rider is seated in an up-right position, making for a comfortable (for very short distances of no more than 3–4 miles), very slow (between 8 and 15 mph), leisurely ride on flat terrain. 
Bicycle baskets, panniers and load-carrying trailers are common for carrying items to school or work or for carrying shopping items back home from the shops. 
Training
 The Dutch train their children to ride so they can confidently ride in the roads when they are around 12 years of age, just before they start secondary school. Only if they pass their traffic exam are they awarded their Verkeersdiploma (traffic certificate). This training is deemed necessary as 75% of secondary school students cycle to school, rising to 84% riding for those living within 5 km of school. (Some 49% of primary school children ride to school, but distances are shorter and adults often accompany the younger ones.)
 Dutch motorists are also trained for interaction with cyclists as part of their driver training when going for their driving licence. For example, trainee motorists are trained to check and re-check their right-hand side for cyclists before making a turn to the right.

These factors together far outweigh the negative factors of wet and windy weather, strong winds due to the flat terrain, and frequent bicycle thefts. Over a quarter of all journeys made in the Netherlands are by bicycle. Even the over 65 age group make nearly a quarter of their journeys by bicycle — though, among this age group, electric bikes are very popular. In some cities over half of all journeys are made by bicycle.

By 2012 cycling had grown tremendously in popularity. In Amsterdam alone, 490,000 cyclists took to the road to cycle 2 million kilometres every day, according to its city council statistics. This has caused some problems as, despite 35,000 kilometers of bicycle paths, the country's 18 million bicycles (1.3 per citizen old enough to ride) sometimes clog Dutch cities' busiest streets. This is being addressed by building even more bike lanes to tackle a problem many other cities in the world would envy — that of bicycle traffic congestion. The Netherlands' busiest cycleway, Vredenburg in the city of Utrecht, sees some 32,000 cyclists on an average weekday, and up to 37,000 on peak days, rivalling the numbers claimed for the busiest cycleway in the world in Copenhagen, Denmark.

In 2011 cycling advocate David Hembrow argued that the Dutch make more cycle journeys between them than the American, British and Australian people added together, and with greater safety than cyclists in any of those countries.

In 2012, the Dutch Fietsersbond (Cyclists' Union) said that a quarter of all deadly crashes in the Netherlands involve cyclists. Research in 2013 showed that 60% of fatal cycling accidents took place at junctions and in two out of five of those accidents, cyclists were not given priority by the driver. From 2007 to 2012, the number of fatal accidents decreased in the Netherlands from 850 to 600, while the number of cycling fatalities remained roughly constant. In 2015, cycling deaths made up 30% of road deaths in the Netherlands, 185 out of 621.

Infrastructure
Many roads have one or two separate cycleways alongside them, or cycle lanes marked on the road. On roads where adjacent bike paths or cycle tracks exist, the use of these facilities is compulsory, and cycling on the main carriageway is not permitted. Some 35,000 km of cycle-track has been physically segregated from motor traffic, equal to a quarter of the country's entire 140,000 km road network. On other roads and streets, bicycle and motor vehicles share the same road-space, but these are usually roads with a low speed limit. The surface quality of these bike lanes are good and the routing tends to be direct with gentle turns making it possible to cycle at good speeds for considerable distances. Cycleways come with their own sets of rules and systems - including traffic signals/lights, tunnels and lanes.

Tunnels and bridges may or may not be accessible for cycling; if pedal cycles are prohibited, there is usually a separate facility. For example, the Western Scheldt Tunnel is not accessible for pedestrians, cyclists or moped riders. They have to use the ferry at another location, or take the bus through the tunnel. Unlike the vast majority of bus services in the Netherlands, three services that cross this tunnel carry bicycles and mopeds. There is a fee for this service and reservation is recommended.

Pedestrians use the pavement where one is available, otherwise they use the same position on the road as the cyclists: on the cycleway or lane if available, otherwise on the road (but in the latter case pedestrians preferably walk on the left, while cyclists go on the right). Roads and tunnels accessible for cyclists are also accessible for pedestrians. Most pedestrian paths are available to cyclists who dismount and walk the bike.

Separate bike paths, parallel to the roadway

When enough space is available, larger roads are fitted with a parallel fietspad (bike path) that is physically separated — for example by means of a verge, hedge, or parking lane — from the roadway. In most cases, these bike paths are also physically separated from an adjacent footpath.

Where protected bike paths exist, their use is in most cases obligatory for cyclists. Mopeds, mofas and the like are allowed and obliged to use them when their maximum speed is no more than 25 km/h (with a blue license plate) (though this has become controversial). When the maximum speed is 45 km/h (yellow license plate), mopeds are only allowed to use the cycle paths if that is indicated (mostly outside of the built-up area). Motorists are not allowed on bike paths, and to enforce this the entry of cars is often made physically impossible by using obstacles. In any case, a single-directional bike path is usually too narrow for cars to travel on.

Bi-directional bike paths on one side of the road are common in towns as well as in the countryside: they are divided into two lanes, similar to roads, by a dashed line. Occasionally bi-directional cycle ways exist on both sides of the road; this reduces the number of times cyclists have to cross the road.

The color of the pavement on a bike lane or path may vary, though red is the standard color to identify bike paths and on-road bike lanes in the Netherlands: either red asphalt or brickwork is used to visually distinguish cycle ways from car lanes and footpaths. Standard black asphalt is also commonly used and some older cycle paths are made of the square tiles commonly used for sidewalks.

On-road bike lanes

On-road bike lanes in the Netherlands are marked by either a dashed line or a solid line: lanes marked by a dashed line may be used by motorists provided that they do not impede cyclists, while those marked with a solid line may not be used by motorists. Solid lines are interrupted on crossings to allow motorists to enter or leave the road. Car parking is never allowed in either type of lane.

Bike lanes are usually surfaced with red or black asphalt. The red colour has no legal meaning, it is there for visibility; the on-road bike lane is delineated by the solid or dashed line by which it is separated from the roadway.

National guidelines advise a minimum width of 1.25 m for cycle lanes.

When a cycle lane is present on a road, cyclists are obliged to use it. Since 15 December 1999 mopeds are not allowed on cycle lanes.

Fietsstraat (cyclestreet)

A fietsstraat (cyclestreet) is a road where bicycles are considered to be the primary and preferred form of transport and where cars and other motorised vehicles are allowed "as guests".  Designs vary, but most examples incorporate red asphalt and have a speed limit of 30 km/h. 

Fietsstraat streets exist mostly in residential areas where low-traffic roads exist anyway. A fietsstraat was in most cases originally a road that had low-traffic volumes beforehand and was therefore easily converted. They are an important type of infrastructure which makes Dutch towns and cities safer for cyclists. They can also be used for route separation to enable cyclists to avoid busier roads and have direct routes into and through towns.

The unravelling of modes

In Dutch towns and cities, many bike-only routes are not alongside the roadway, nor do they run close by and parallel to major car routes: rather, cycle routes are often completely separate from motor vehicle routes. In many cases, dedicated bike routes are far more direct than the local car routes are to common destinations, such as town centres. This complete separation of bicycle routes from motor vehicle routes is called the unravelling of modes and is an important feature of modern Dutch urban design and traffic management.

For instance, many Dutch towns and cities have a "soft" green core that is only accessible to cyclists and pedestrians. Therefore, while drivers wishing to cross the town may have to take a lengthy detour via a ring road, cyclists can take a direct route through the town centre.

Other cycle routes work similarly. On a small scale, short sections of cycle path can provide a short cut between streets that cars cannot take, while on a larger scale entire streets are sometimes converted to cycle paths to provide more room for cyclists and discourage the use of motorized vehicles.

Free-running cycle paths also exist for recreational purposes, in parks and in the countryside. These are usually bidirectional.

Countryside
On busy and important routes, cycling facilities in the countryside are similar to those in the cities. Cycle paths are made where possible, and cycle lanes otherwise. If the available space is too limited even for a cycle lane, for example when a road passes through a village, speed-reducing measures are usually taken to ensure that the difference in speed between cyclists and motorists is tolerable.

Highways and "provincial roads" (main roads for which a province is responsible), are usually fitted with separate cycle paths. Motorways, on the other hand, rarely have cycling facilities associated with them. If a cycle path is bundled with a motorway it usually lies at a relatively large distance from the road, outside the traffic barriers and noise barriers.

Apart from these utility paths and lanes, many recreational paths are available in the countryside. Their pavement varies from gravel through asphalt. Crushed seashells are a popular variant.

Snelfietsroutes (Fast bike routes) 

A bicycle-only route intended for cycling longer distances for practical reasons such as commuting or for sport and exercise can either be called a snelfietsroute (fast bike route) or a fietssnelweg (cycle highway). Some characteristics of these cycling routes mentioned by governments (both national and local) and traffic experts are bi-directional paths with recommended uni-directional lane widths of 2 metres and minimum widths of 1.5 metres; very level and straight stretches (i.e. few ups and downs, curves or turns); the absence of traffic lights and level crossings with motorised traffic; and superior pavement quality.

Cycling interest groups and national and local governments advocate such routes as being a solution for the further reduction of vehicular traffic congestion: this is because, as cyclists can achieve higher average speeds on these routes than on the usual types of cycling infrastructure, so cyclists are better able to compete with the car for longer commutes on them.

, cycle highways currently being constructed include one between Rotterdam and Delft, and one between Nijmegen and Arnhem (the RijnWaalpad). Most fast-cycling routes/cycle highway projects are not entirely purpose-built, but consist of upgrading existing infrastructure and adding missing links between them.

Roundabouts
Some roundabouts have cyclist lanes around them, with signposts directing the cyclist to a destination. Traffic on roundabouts in the Netherlands usually has priority over entering traffic, and when a cycle lane is bundled with it this priority also applies to the cyclists. This means that cars have to give priority to bicycles both when entering and exiting the roundabout.

Other roundabouts have separate cycle paths around them. Signs indicate whether the cycle path or the crossing road has priority. Many authorities give priority to the crossing roads, as this is thought to be safer. For fairness, others retain the priority that the cyclists would have had if they had not been using a separate cycle path (which they are obliged to use).

A very busy roundabout in Eindhoven uses tunnels and an interior roundabout for cyclists to keep the two traffic streams completely apart.

The Hovenring

The Hovenring is an architectural first for bicycle infrastructure. Opening on 29 June 2012, it is an elevated circular suspension bridge and bicycle-only roundabout built in between the localities of Eindhoven, Veldhoven and Meerhoven (thus the name, being Dutch for "Ring of the 'Hovens'") in the province of North Brabant. Built over a large and busy road intersection, where before its construction cyclists had to cross busy roads, it is the first suspended bicycle roundabout in the world.

Crossing rivers and motorways

To protect cyclists from motorised traffic when they need to cross motorways and other busy roads, dedicated cycling bridges and tunnels for cyclists are built. Such facilities are often shared with pedestrians.

The small waterways such as canals, which abound especially throughout western Holland, will often have dedicated bridges for cyclists or ones that they share with pedestrians. However, to cross large waterways, cycle paths are often situated alongside roads (for instance the Hollandse Brug) or sometimes railroads (for example the Nijmegen railway bridge). Long road tunnels are rarely open to cyclists.

When roads and railroads are too far away, ferries often provide an alternative in the Netherlands. In many cases, ferries operate exclusively or primarily for cyclists and to a lesser extent for pedestrians.

Traffic signals
Because of their constant use, cycleways are complete with their own system of traffic signals. These are present at junctions, one set for motorised vehicles and a visually smaller set for cyclists. Sometimes this is similar to a pelican crossing, where the cyclists wait to cross the junction. These lights come in two forms - firstly the miniature version of the vehicle lights and secondly a regular sized signal with bicycle-shaped cutouts.

In many locations more direct cycle routes exist which bypass traffic signals, allowing cyclists to make more efficient journeys than motorists.

Occasionally, cyclists are explicitly allowed to pass a red traffic light if they make a right turn on an intersection. They are also allowed to ignore a red light if they go through the top of a T junction on a cycle path, as there is never interaction between motorists and cyclists, and cyclists can negotiate easily with other cyclists and pedestrians.

Signage

Signposts take on the form of road signs, with directions stating the distances to nearby cities and towns. Signposts come in two different forms: the common directional signpost which is a miniature version of the vehicle signs and padstool signs, mushroom-shaped direction posts. Padstools are used in the countryside where it is thought to blend in better with its surroundings. Sometimes it can be hard to notice in long grass.

In contrast to the signposts for traffic in general, which feature white lettering on a blue background, the signposts for cyclists have red or green lettering on a white background. Red is used for the usual route and green for more scenic routes where mopeds are not allowed. The mushroom-style signpost can also have black lettering on a white background (as it is obvious that it is not meant for motorists). A newer style of "mushroom" has red lettering.

When a general (white on blue) signpost is not applicable for cyclists because it relies on a motorway, this is indicated with a small car sign or a motorway sign behind the name of the destination. In such cases, a separate signpost for cyclists is usually nearby.

Most road signs for cyclists that are used in the Netherlands are universal. However, some are specific to the country and may even include some Dutch text, e.g. fietspad (cycle path), racer te gast (racers (road cyclists) are guests), (brom)fietsers oversteken (cyclists and moped riders must cross the road), uitgezonderd fietsers (except for cyclists) or rechtsaf fietsers vrij (turning right free for cyclists).

The numbered-node cycle network was first introduced in the Netherlands in 1999, and by 2014, the entire Netherlands was part to the network. The system is displacing more traditional national cycling route network signage (long, named routes, each individually signposted, called LF routes in the Netherlands). In 2017–2021, the Netherlands reduced its LF-routes, amalgamating some of them. The ways themselves remained part of the numbered-node network.

Parking

By policy in the Netherlands, bicycle parking is supposed to be provided next to every shop. Bicycle stands are common around the Netherlands, an alternative to chaining the bike to a post. In most, the front wheel of the bicycle rests on the stand. As bike theft is very common in the Netherlands, cyclists are advised to lock their bicycle with a built-in lock and attach a chain from the bike frame to the stand.

There are many bicycle parking stations, particularly in city centres and at train stations, some of which hold many thousands of bicycles. Every railway station has a cycle parking attached, and most also offer guarded cycle parking for a nominal fee. Since the start of the 21st century, parking spaces for 450,000 bicycles were built and modernized at over 400 train stations, and Dutch railways organizations ProRail and NS are calling for expansion by another 250,000 by 2027. Already half of all Dutch train travellers cycle to the station, amounting to half a million cyclists daily. These types of bicycle parking stations also exist in other places around most cities, for example, there are 20 watched bicycle parking stations situated in the city of Groningen (population ≈198,000).

Most city councils enforce the parking of bicycles in their jurisdictions by regularly removing any bicycles that are not placed in the bike stands. The locks are cut and for the owner to reclaim their bicycle they must pay a fine of around €25. Cyclist journeys are made more convenient by such actions as it prevents sidewalks being littered with bikes.

Bike rental
Bikes for all ages are readily available for rent across the country and most large towns have bike shops with all the necessary equipment and repair services. All cities possess multiple bike stands, mainly at the supermarkets and other commonly used shops. Bikes should also come with a lock so as to keep the bike from being stolen. A national scheme, Cycleswap, supports small businesses privately renting bicycles out for short-term use.

OV-fiets

OV-fiets (literally: "Public Transport bicycle") is the name of a very large, nationwide bicycle rental / sharing system run by Nederlandse Spoorwegen aka NS (Dutch Railways) — by far the Netherlands' largest rail service operator. Almost 15,000 OV-fietsen are offered for rent at over 300 locations across the Netherlands; at many train stations, at bus or tram stops, in several city centres and at P+R car parks. When you arrive at a town's station by train, you can quickly rent an OV-fiets to cycle to your destination.

The OV-fiets program, which started on a small scale in 2003, has steadily grown in popularity, first registering 1 million rides in 2011, but Dutch Rail expected 3 million rides in 2017, up 25% from 2.4 million in 2016. However, this was even exceeded — the number came out at 3.2 million.

In recent years Dutch Rail expanded their rental fleet by around 1000 bicycles a year to keep up with demand. However, a surge in demand forced NS to rush order an extra 6000 bicycles in 2017. The company aimed to have 14,500 bicycles available by the end of 2017.

Membership to the OV-fiets scheme is required, but as of 1 January 2017 only costs €0.01 per year, to verify identity and payment data. Bikes can be accessed using the normal NS public transport card — and 24-hour rental costs €3.85. Since the new policy is in place, the number of registered users has jumped from ≈200,000 to ≈500,000.

The nature of the OV-fiets bike sharing program differs somewhat from that of similar schemes in other countries, partly because of the already high bike ownership of the population. The Dutch system is highly integrated with the public transport network, so that people who cycle to the station in their place of origin can
continue traveling by bike from the station of their destination.

Swapfiets
Swapfiets is a bike rental service for residents of several European countries that, for a fixed monthly price, provides a bicycle and covers all repair costs.
The service started as a startup that rented refurbished bikes but has since developed an in-house design featuring a distinctive blue front tire.

Bicycle touring

For bicycle touring, all Dutch cities can be accessed on the dedicated cycling routes. There are two main signage systems, the older named-route Dutch National Cycle Network — the LF-routes — and the numbered-node cycle network or  network. There are also additional regional cycle paths. Some of the LF routes have been amalgamated and removed in 2017–2021, and may not be shown accurately on older maps; the former LF routes are now part of the  network, which is displacing named long-distance routes in Belgium and the Netherlands. An average cyclist can typically expect to cover between 15 and 18 kilometres, on average, in an hour by bike throughout most areas of the Netherlands.

Print cycling maps are widely available and come in two forms:
Route maps: a national map which shows route information rather than general topography. Only the routes are marked and related information are shown. They are often used for holidays and are sold at most tourist shops.
National maps: These cover the whole country, with markings and symbols about the cycleways of the Netherlands. Most national cycle maps will include the LF-routes and the other routes of the numbered-node cycle network. These are used for cycling in unfamiliar towns and cities, and also for cross-country use.

There are also comprehensive digital maps and route planning tools in a variety of languages, available online or in downloadable apps. OpenStreetMap, a Wikipedia-style map, has extensive information on the numbered-node network, available as downloadable maps and datasets under the Open Database License.

Though the LF-route network is the national cycling route network of the Netherlands, some of its routes extend into the neighbouring countries of Belgium and Germany; the LF1 even extends all the way down the North Sea coast to Boulogne-sur-Mer in France.

There is also a professional cycle-tour industry in the Netherlands, run by professional cycling-tour operators.

Transporting bicycles
It is possible to take bicycles on trains, aircraft and ferries. Buses, however, will only carry folded bicycles.

Trains
Bicycles may be carried on trains under certain conditions. Folding bicycles can be taken more easily than other types as regular bicycles must be placed in designated areas. Taking a folded bicycle inside a train is free, but for unfolded bicycles and regular ones a special ticket is required. , these tickets cost €7.50 per bicycle and are valid for a whole day. In all trains it is prohibited to carry normal size and (partly) unfolded bikes during peak hours, though this restriction does not apply in the summer in July and August when bikes can be carried for free at any time. All bicycles are allowed, even a recumbent or a tandem. However, it is prohibited to take a tricycle or a bicycle trailer on trains.

Travellers are expected to place their bicycles in the designated areas: blue stickers on or near the doors indicate where they are.

Ferries
Ferries are commonplace in the Netherlands for crossing both rivers and canals, including numerous foot ferries that operate especially for cyclists and foot passengers saving them from making long detours. There are ferries as well as to the islands in the North (Texel, Vlieland, Terschelling, Ameland and Schiermonnikoog). It is important to know where ferries are and when they run.

Some ferries (such as those to Texel,
Vlieland, Terschelling, Ameland
and Schiermonnikoog) impose an extra charge for bicycles, while others (such as those across the IJ in Amsterdam) carry bicycles for free.

By air
It is possible to take bicycles by air, but the airline's procedures must be followed to pack the bicycle and possibly dismantle it. There may also be extra fees as the bicycle will count as luggage. Again, travelling with a foldable bike is easier.

The Fietsstad (Bicycle city) awards
Every few years, a jury from the Dutch Fietsersbond (Cyclists' Union) conducts the Fietsstad awards where a city is bestowed the honour of being a recognised Fietsstad (Bicycle City). The main criteria for winning is not which of the competing cities has the best overall cycling environment but rather which city is already great for cycling and has improved their cycling environment even further. Furthermore, in some years there is a unique theme that the jury use to decide the winner.

 the cities that have been elected Fietsstad are:

Gallery

See also
 Transport in the Netherlands
 Bicycle monarchy
 Cycling in Amsterdam
 Dutch National Cycle Routes
 Fietsersbond (the Cyclists' Union)
 David Hembrow
 Outline of cycling

Notes

References

Further reading
 Dekker, Henk-Jan (2021). Cycling Pathways: The Politics and Governance of Dutch Cycling Infrastructure, 1920-2020. Amsterdam University Press.
 Bek, Patrick (2022). No Bicycle, No Bus, No Job: The Making of Workers’ Mobility in the Netherlands, 1920-1990. Amsterdam University Press.
 Fietsberaad agency (Dutch Cycling Council), Cycling in the Netherlands, published by Dutch Ministry of Transport, Public Works and Water Management, 2009. Extensive English language report by the Dutch government.
 CROW – Dutch Cycling Embassy: Design Manual for Bicycle Traffic, 2017, . English language design manual, aimed at traffic management professionals and infrastructure designers.
 Pete Jordan, In the City of Bikes: The Story of the Amsterdam Cyclist, HarperCollins publishers, 2013, . A memoir of this American's love affair with Amsterdam and its bike-centric culture.
 Shirley Agudo, The Dutch & Their Bikes: Scenes from a Nation of Cyclists, XPat Scriptum Publishers, 2014, . A photobook by an American native and long-time resident of the Netherlands.

External links

General and practical
The Dutch Cycling Embassy - a portal to Dutch expertise on cycling.
Practicality is key to Dutch bicycle culture - the view of an American social documentary photographer and author.
No helmets, no problem+: how the Dutch created a casual biking culture, by David Roberts, Vox, 28 August 2018
Making Cycling Irresistible a review of cycling policy in the Netherlands.
Cycling safely in Amsterdam Brochure from the Dutch traffic department.

 
Dutch culture